The United States Penitentiary, Canaan (USP Canaan) is a high-security United States federal prison for male inmates, with a satellite prison camp for minimum-security male inmates. It is operated by the Federal Bureau of Prisons, a division of the United States Department of Justice.

History and facility
USP Canaan is a  facility designed by David R. Cassara Associates, Structural Engineering and Consulting of Rochester, New York for $141 million. USP Canaan opened in March 2005 and is designed to house 1088 male inmates in six housing units. Six V-shaped buildings facing each other and a larger maintenance building surround a central yard with a tower in the middle. Six additional towers are lined along the rectangular-shaped facility. The facility is surrounded by a lethal electrical double fence.

Cells are usually occupied by two inmates and are air conditioned. The administrative and disciplinary unit, called the Special Housing Unit, can hold approximately 250 inmates. Cells in the disciplinary unit have showers and are occupied by two inmates.

Units A1 & A2, closest to the dining area and the Receiving & Discharge area, are primarily used for inmates in transit. One unit houses Minimum and Low security inmates in transit and the other housing Medium and Maximum security inmates. Administrative Maximum custody inmates are generally housed in the SHU during transit.  
These units have also been used when the USP Canaan SHU is filled beyond capacity. Inmates will then be locked in a cell without a shower and only be able to shower three times weekly. 

Inmate transit usually occurs at least twice a week to and from USP Canaan with Monday being the “airlift” day where inmates are brought to the Harrisburg airport by bus for secure transit to another prison. The trips to the next prison occur either by another bus trip or a flight on what is often called “Con Air” (operated by US Marshals Justice Prisoner & Alien Transportation System or JPATS). 
Tuesday is generally the transit day for inmates going to or from MDC Brooklyn and MCC Manhattan (when it was open).

Notable incidents
Four inmate murders have taken place at USP Canaan since its opening in 2005. 
On 25 April 2010, Allen Hurley, an inmate serving a 37-year sentence for multiple armed robberies, became involved in a physical altercation with Joseph O'Kane while they were both in Hurley's cell. Hurley pulled out a homemade prison knife known as a shank, and stabbed O'Kane 92 times. O'Kane, an associate of the Gambino Crime Family in New York City who was serving a life sentence for racketeering and murder, died at the scene. Hurley was convicted of manslaughter on 21 June 2012 and was sentenced to life in prison in September 2012. Now at ADX Florence
On 23 August 2010, inmate Jose Antonio Perez, the leader of a major drug trafficking ring in Hartford, Connecticut, died of a single stab wound to the neck. Perez was serving a life sentence for drug trafficking and murder for hire in connection with the 2002 shooting death of Theodore Casiano, the leader of a rival drug trafficking organization. Perez's murder remains under investigation.
On 11 January 2013, inmate Ephraim Goitom was pronounced dead at a hospital about an hour after a fight. Goitom had been serving a 25-year sentence for shooting a police officer during a raid on Goitom's home.
On 25 February 2013, an inmate of the prison attacked and murdered Correction Officer Eric Williams, 34, of Nanticoke, Pennsylvania. Jessie Con-ui, already jailed for life for slaying a gang rival in Arizona, was identified as the suspect in the murder of officer Eric Williams. Con-ui and two other gang members fatally shot Carlos Garcia outside a laundry facility in East Phoenix, Ariz. in August 2002 to "further or assist" the gang's criminal conduct, according to state prosecutors and Maricopa County, Ariz. court records. Con-ui, 36, was scheduled to complete his federal sentence in September 2013 and would have immediately been returned to Arizona to begin serving his life term for the 2002 murder. Con-ui, at the time of the incident, was serving an 11-year term for gang-related drug trafficking.

Other incidents: In June 2011, 300 inmates and several staff members became ill after eating chicken in the prison dining room. The Pennsylvania State Department of Health was called in to investigate and determined that the cause was salmonella poisoning. The incident constituted one of the largest institutional outbreaks of salmonella poisoning in US history. No one became critically ill.

Notable inmates (current and former)

See also
List of U.S. federal prisons
Incarceration in the United States

References

External links
 USP Canaan official website

Prisons in Pennsylvania
Canaan
Buildings and structures in Wayne County, Pennsylvania
2005 establishments in Pennsylvania